Crawfordsville Commercial Historic District is a national historic district located at Crawfordsville, Montgomery County, Indiana.  The district encompasses 105 contributing buildings, 1 contributing structure, and 1 contributing object in the central business district of Crawfordsville.  It developed between about 1836 and 1940, and includes notable examples of Italianate, Classical Revival, and Bungalow/American Craftsman style architecture.  Located in the district are the separately listed Montgomery County Jail and Sheriff's Residence and Otto Schlemmer Building.  Other notable buildings are the Montgomery County Courthouse (1876), Ben Hur Life Building (1911), Hanna-Graham Building, Elston Bank Building (1869), Masonic Temple (1902), Carnegie Library (1902), Commerce Building (1907), Municipal Building (1933), Indiana National Guard Armory (1939), and U.S. Post Office (1940).

It was listed on the National Register of Historic Places in 1992.

References

Historic districts on the National Register of Historic Places in Indiana
Italianate architecture in Indiana
Neoclassical architecture in Indiana
Bungalow architecture in Indiana
Historic districts in Montgomery County, Indiana
National Register of Historic Places in Montgomery County, Indiana
Commercial Historic District